Queensgate shopping centre may refer to:
 Queensgate shopping centre, United Kingdom, a shopping centre in Peterborough
 Queensgate Shopping Centre, New Zealand, a shopping centre in Lower Hutt